The 2021 Challenger Ciudad de Guayaquil was a professional tennis tournament played on clay courts. It was the seventeenth edition of the tournament which was part of the 2021 ATP Challenger Tour. It took place in Guayaquil, Ecuador between 1 and 7 November 2021.

Singles main-draw entrants

Seeds

 1 Rankings are as of 25 October 2021.

Other entrants
The following players received wildcards into the singles main draw:
  Facundo Bagnis
  Álvaro Guillén Meza
  Diego Hidalgo

The following players received entry into the singles main draw as alternates:
  Facundo Díaz Acosta
  Alexis Galarneau

The following players received entry from the qualifying draw:
  Nicolás Álvarez
  Daniel Dutra da Silva
  Alejandro González
  Facundo Juárez

The following player received entry as a lucky loser:
  Nicolás Álvarez Varona

Champions

Singles

 Alejandro Tabilo def.  Jesper de Jong 6–1, 7–5.

Doubles

 Jesper de Jong /  Bart Stevens def.  Diego Hidalgo /  Cristian Rodríguez 7–5, 6–2.

References

2021 ATP Challenger Tour
2021
2021 in Ecuadorian sport
November 2021 sports events in South America